Paraplatyptilia immaculata is a moth of the family Pterophoridae first described by James Halliday McDunnough in 1939. It is found in North America, including California.

The forewings are light creamy-white, tinged with smoky along the costa from the base to the cleft. There is a very faint smoky dot below the base of the cleft on the second lobe. The hindwings are pale brownish.

References

Moths described in 1939
immaculata
Moths of North America